Ambrose Light was a brigantine, operated by Colombian rebels during the Colombian Civil War of 1885.  It was captured by the USS Alliance as a suspected pirate vessel in 1885.  The accusation of piracy was rejected by a court of law.

Capture

On April 24, Commander Lewis Clark, of the South Atlantic Squadron, was sailing to Cartagena, on the Caribbean coast of Colombia, when the lookouts aboard the Alliance sighted the one-gun Ambrose Light. It was flying a strange flag featuring a red cross over a white background so the Americans assumed the vessel was a pirate ship. A chase began. The Americans were preparing to fire a shot over the vessel's bow when a Colombian ensign was observed and the Ambrose Light came to a halt. Commander Clark put Lieutenant M. Fisher, and a boarding party, on the rebel ship and it was found to have been armed with one cannon and sixty heavily armed sailors. A large cache of ammunition was also discovered. The Colombians revealed their letter of marque from the rebel leader Pedro Lara, giving the men of Ambrose Light permission to blockade Cartagena. Commander Clark disregarded this and took the rebels prisoner and the brigantine as a prize. The ship was put under the command of Lieutenant Fisher with ten others and sent to be condemned in New York. After arriving on June 1, a stowaway was found, starving to death, hiding behind some casks in the cargo hold. The man immediately received medical attention.

Legal case
Following the court proceedings, it was agreed that Alliance had lawfully seized the rebels as pirates because Pedro Lara, or any rebel, had no right to commission warships.

After a legal decision, the ship was returned to her Colombian owners, in return for costs. The court ruled that the ship could legally be used to transport troops between Colombian ports during the Colombian Civil War. When fighting broke out in Cartagena, American Secretary of State Thomas F. Bayard released Ambrose Light and her crew.

This incident was the basis for a decision in case law that defines who can be called a pirate in the United States.

See also
West Indies Anti-Piracy Operations of the United States

References

Pirate ships
Vessels captured by the United States Navy
United States admiralty case law
United States Navy in the 19th century
History of Colombia
Maritime incidents in April 1885
Battles and conflicts without fatalities
Piracy in the Caribbean
Brigantines